The Nene Valley Railway (NVR) is a preserved railway in Cambridgeshire, England, running between Peterborough Nene Valley and Yarwell Junction. There are stations at each terminus, and three stops en route: Orton Mere, Ferry Meadows and Wansford.

History

Origins

In 1845, the London and Birmingham Railway (L&BR) company was given parliamentary assent to construct a line from Blisworth in Northamptonshire to Peterborough. Completed in 1847, it was Peterborough's first railway line. It terminated at Peterborough, later 'Peterborough East' station.

The line was of little significance until the late 19th century, when the London & North Western Railway (L&NWR), which had absorbed the L&BR, constructed a line via Nassington and King's Cliffe to Seaton, below Welland Viaduct. This turned Wansford, previously an unimportant village station, into a major junction. Its importance increased a few years later when the Great Northern Railway constructed another line via Sutton, Southorpe and Barnack to Stamford, on the Midland Railway line. In 1884 the line received a royal visit when the royal family travelled from Peterborough to Barnwell, some  beyond Wansford, to visit Barnwell Manor, home of the then Duke of Gloucester. The station building is now preserved at Wansford station on the NVR, and is known as the Barnwell building.

Between 1900 and the 1960s, the line formed an important connection from Norwich, Cambridge and eastern England to Northampton and the Midlands. The line was generally acknowledged to be a secondary main line and frequently saw large engines such as Black 5s and B1s. However, the NVR was one of the last passenger line closures of the Dr Beeching era, services to Northampton and Rugby having ceased in 1964 and 1966 respectively. It remained open until 1972 for freight traffic only.

Society formed

In 1968, the Rev. Richard Paten had bought BR Standard Class 5 4-6-0 locomotive, number 73050, for its scrap value of £3,000. His intention had been to exhibit it outside Peterborough Technology College as a monument to Peterborough's railway history. However, the locomotive was found to be in good working order, and there was much opposition to the idea of the engine being "stuffed", and it was decided to restore it to full working order.

On 28 March 1969, the Peterborough Branch of the East Anglian Locomotive Society was formed, with the intention of purchasing and restoring the BR Pacific locomotive, number BR Standard Class 7 70000 Britannia. By 1970, the branch was strong enough to operate independently as the Peterborough Locomotive Society (PLS). In 1971, 73050 was moved to the British Sugar Corporation's sidings at Fletton, where it was joined by Hunslet 0-6-0 locomotive 'Jack's Green'. Later that year, the PLS held a meeting at which the group's name was changed to 'Peterborough Railway Society' and the idea of the Nene Valley Railway was formally launched.

Purchase of line and locomotives

In 1974, the Peterborough Development Corporation (PDC) bought the Nene Valley line between Longville and Yarwell Junctions and it began leasing it to the PRS to operate the railway – a major milestone in the society's history.

When the PRS acquired the line, the intention was to work the line with British locomotives and stock. However, enthusiasts from other railways and preservation societies had already acquired almost all of the serviceable ex-BR locomotives – all that was left was a collection of rusting hulks.  Apart from 73050, the society's locomotives were mostly small, industrial shunting engines and therefore not suitable for the  round trip. Ex-BR rolling stock was also in very short supply following the disposal of most pre-nationalisation (pre-1948) stock. The PDC, having paid out a considerable sum of money for the line, was anxious that trains should start running as soon as possible – certainly before the opening of the new Nene Park in 1978. However, with the PRC's lack of stock and locomotives this looked highly improbable.

In 1973, PRS member Richard Hurlock had approached the society for a home for his ex-Swedish State Railways (SJ) class S1 2-6-4T oil-fired locomotive, number 1928. Because the engine was higher and wider than British stock, it was to be a static exhibition only. During 1974, it was realised that the use of foreign stock and engines could answer the NVR's aspirations. After a feasibility study was carried out, it was discovered that only one bridge would have to be demolished to allow the running to continental loading gauge. Some reductions would also have to be made to the width of the platforms. In 1973, BR gave PRS permission to use Wansford signal box and, in September of that year, the first items of stock arrived at the PRS depot.

Operation
Before the stock could be moved from the BSC depot to Wansford, the missing  of the Fletton Loop had to be rebuilt, allowing access to the Nene Valley line. The track was completed in March 1974 and the stock moved to Wansford in time for the Easter weekend, when the new 'Wansford Steam Centre' opened for the first time. Between 1974 and 1977, the line was upgraded to passenger-carrying standard and the first passenger train ran on 1 June 1977, hauled by the 'Nord 3.628' – a French 4-6-0 locomotive and 'SJ 1178' – another Swedish tank engine, pulling a set of ex-BR electrical multiple unit coaches owned by the Southern Electric Group.

Extension to Peterborough
In the early 1980s, the NVR decided to extend its running line, which then terminated at Orton Mere station, along the route of the original Nene Valley Line to a new station west of the East Coast Main Line, adjacent to the new Railworld Museum. Peterborough Nene Valley opened, for the first time, on the Late Spring Bank Holiday weekend of 26 May 1986. This extended the NVR to its current length, .

Stations

Yarwell Junction

Yarwell Junction is the former junction between the lines to Northampton and Market Harborough. It is the current terminus of the NVR's operating line. In April 2006 the track was realigned, allowing a platform to be built at Yarwell Junction, which opened at Easter 2007 (there was never previously a station on the site). The new station is linked by footpaths to Nassington and the mill village of Yarwell, but there is no vehicular access.

Wansford

Wansford is the headquarters of the railway and most of the facilities are based here. The current station building was opened in 1995 and contains a ticket office, shop, cafe and toilets. The locomotive sheds are located at this station. Also at the station there is a picnic area and children's playground. The station was formerly the junction for a branch to Stamford, which diverged to the north just east of the river bridge at Wansford. The original Wansford station is located on platform three and was built in 1844–1845 in Jacobean style for the opening of the railway. This building was purchased by the railway in 2015.

Castor

Castor is a disused station between Wansford and Ferry Meadows. It closed in the 1960s and despite the NVR (which runs through it) reopening, the station remains closed.

Ferry Meadows

Ferry Meadows is located near the site of Orton Waterville station and provides access to the nearby country park. The current building was moved brick by brick from the old goods yard at Fletton Junction on the East Coast Main Line; it replaced a portable building desperately in need of repair. NVR has now added a canopy. The station building was offered to the NVR for £1 plus transportation costs. The Park is open throughout the year, but most facilities such as the miniature railway and pedaloes only run from Easter to the end of October. The station is also the site of the new Night Mail Museum, with construction well under way with some exhibits open to view. Ferry Meadows station was renamed Overton 'for Ferry Meadows' in 2017 in conjunction with the Nene Valley Railway's 40th anniversary celebrations.

Orton Mere

Orton Mere is a two platform station with a station building built in 1983 and a signal box.  Until 1986 this was the terminus of the line. Most trains depart from platform 1. Just outside the station towards Peterborough is the Fletton Loop which links the NVR to the mainline. The signal box controls the passing loop and had to be adapted from one lever to three.

This station provides access to the eastern end of the Nene Park.

Longville Junction
As of March 2013, there is no platform here, as Orton Mere station is only a few hundred yards close by.

Peterborough (Nene Valley)

Peterborough Nene Valley (aka Peterborough West), is the current end of the line. Here there is a platform, a bay platform and a station building housing a ticket office, a small souvenir shop and toilets. It is a 10-minute walk from here to Peterborough City Centre. Railworld is next door to the station with a wide variety of rolling stock on display. It is currently planned to relocate the station building currently at Wansford Road Station (on the old line from Wansford to Stamford) to here.

As a film location
The line has been a location for filming over 150 TV shows, films, adverts and music videos.

Between 1977 and 1979, many sequences for the BBC's wartime drama Secret Army were filmed here, principally at Wansford station.

In 1982, Wansford station was used for six weeks to shoot scenes featuring Roger Moore and Maud Adams for the James Bond film Octopussy.

Scenes for the biplane/helicopter dogfight from the 1986 film Biggles: Adventures in Time were filmed here, involving one memorable shot where the helicopter piloted by Biggles "lands" on a flat-bed railway carriage. 

Another Bond film GoldenEye was also filmed on the line. For the film, a Class 20 was disguised as a Russian armoured train. In the film, a tunnel that the train seemingly goes into is in fact a small bridge over the tracks.

In 2008, Penélope Cruz and Daniel Day-Lewis were among the actors who worked on the filming of the live-action film Nine on the Railway.

TV shows filmed here include EastEnders, Casualty, Silent Witness, Dalziel and Pascoe and Poirot.

See also
Peterborough railway station
Peterborough East railway station
Nene Valley (disambiguation)

References

External links

Official Nene Valley Railway website

 
Heritage railways in Cambridgeshire
Standard gauge railways in England
Transport in Peterborough
1969 establishments in England